Elements of Corrosion is the third and final release by technical death metal band Oppressor. It was released in 1998.

Track listing

Personnel
Oppressor
 Adam Zadel – guitarist
 Tim King – bass, vocals
 Tom Schofield – drums
 Jim Stopper – guitar

Production
 Tim King - cover art
 Brian Griffin - engineering, producer
 Brad Hall - photography

External links
 Oppressor at Encyclopedia Metallum
 
 Oppressor on Myspace

1998 albums
Oppressor albums